Heinroth is a surname. Notable people with the surname include:

Johann Christian August Heinroth (1773–1843), German physician
Klaus Heinroth (born 1944), East German canoeist
Magdalena Heinroth (1883–1932), German ornithologist, aviculturist, and taxidermist
Oskar Heinroth (1871–1945), German biologist